Celmia is a Neotropical genus of butterflies in the family Lycaenidae.

Species
Celmia celmus (Cramer, [1775]) Mexico to Amazonas, Colombia, Surinam
Celmia uzza (Hewitson, 1873) Brazil
Celmia color (Druce, 1907) French Guiana, Brazil
Celmia mecrida (Hewitson, 1867) Brazil
Celmia anastomosis (Draudt, [1918]) French Guiana, Brazil
Celmia conoveria (Schaus, 1902) Brazil

References

External links
Images representing Celmia at Consortium for the Barcode of Life

Eumaeini
Lycaenidae of South America
Lycaenidae genera